Doina Ignat (born 20 December 1968 in Rădăuți-Prut, Botoşani) is a Romanian rower, who has won six Olympic medals during her career.

References

External links 
 
 
 
 

1968 births
Living people
Romanian female rowers
Rowers at the 1992 Summer Olympics
Rowers at the 1996 Summer Olympics
Rowers at the 2000 Summer Olympics
Rowers at the 2004 Summer Olympics
Rowers at the 2008 Summer Olympics
Olympic rowers of Romania
Olympic gold medalists for Romania
Olympic silver medalists for Romania
Olympic bronze medalists for Romania
Olympic medalists in rowing
Medalists at the 2008 Summer Olympics
Medalists at the 2004 Summer Olympics
Medalists at the 2000 Summer Olympics
Medalists at the 1996 Summer Olympics
Medalists at the 1992 Summer Olympics
European Rowing Championships medalists